The efferent ducts (or efferent ductules or ductuli efferentes or ductus efferentes or vasa efferentia) connect the rete testis with the initial section of the epididymis.

There are two basic designs for efferent ductule structure: 
 a) multiple entries into the epididymis, as seen in most large mammals. In humans and other large mammals, there are approximately 15 to 20 efferent ducts, which also occupy nearly one third of the head of the epididymis. 
 b) single entry, as seen in most small animals such as rodents, where by the 3–6 ductules merge into a single small ductule prior to entering the epididymis.

The ductuli are unilaminar and composed of columnar ciliated and non-ciliated (absorptive) cells. The ciliated cells serve to stir the luminal fluids, possibly to help ensure homogeneous absorption of water from the fluid produced by the testis, which results in an increase in the concentration of luminal sperm. The epithelium is surrounded by a band of smooth muscle that helps to propel the sperm toward the epididymis.

Additional images

External links
  – "Mammal, testis overview"
  – "Inguinal Region, Scrotum and Testes: Reflection of the Head of the Epididymis"
 
 Diagram/Quiz (cancer.gov)

References

Hess RA 2018. Efferent ductules: structure and function. Encyclopedia of Reproduction. Skinner MK. San Diego, Academic Press: Elsevier. 1: 270-278.

Scrotum